Lacchini is an impact crater on the far side of the Moon. It is located in the northern hemisphere, just behind the northwestern limb of the visible Moon. This part of the lunar surface can sometimes be viewed under favorable conditions of libration and illumination, but at such times the crater is only seen from the edge.

Less than one crater diameter to the east is the larger crater Bragg. To the north is Stefan, and farther to the southeast is the walled plain Lorentz. Due west of Laccini is Landau, another walled plain.

The outer rim of Lacchini is roughly circular, with outward bulges to the south and east. The edge is sharp and not significantly eroded. The inner walls have slumped around much of the circumference, forming an irregular ring of talus about the interior floor. There are some low ridges near the midpoint and in the eastern half of the floor.

See also 
 Asteroid 145962 Lacchini

References

 
 
 
 
 
 
 
 
 
 
 
 

Impact craters on the Moon